Disappearing World may refer to:
 Disappearing World (TV series), a 1970–1993 British documentary television series
 "Disappearing World" (Sheryl Crow song)
 Disappearing World, an album by Fair